Somnath Bharti (born 10 May 1974) is an Indian lawyer who has become a politician representing the Aam Aadmi Party (AAP). As a lawyer, he practised at the Supreme Court of India and Delhi High Court. He was elected as the AAP candidate for the Malviya Nagar constituency in the 2013 Delhi state assembly elections and was Minister of Law, Tourism, Administrative Reforms, Art & Culture in the Government of Delhi, from 28 December 2013 to 14 February 2014, at which time the AAP government resigned. He has served as MLA from Malviya Nagar Constituency from February 2015 - February 2020. He served as Chairman, Committee on Privileges of Delhi Legislative Assembly for the year 2016–17. On 10 August 2018, Delhi Legislative Assembly appointed him as chairman, Committee to examine the Stray Dog and Monkey Menace in Delhi. He won the 2020 Delhi Elections by 18,144 votes. By Delhi Legislative Assembly he was appointed Chairman, Public Accounts Committee (one of the three most important Committees of a legislative assembly or Indian Parliament viz. Public Accounts Committee, Committee on Govt Undertakings and Committee on Estimates), Chairman, House Committee on Violation of Protocol Norms and Contemptuous Behaviour By Government Officers with MLAs, Members of Standing Committee on Education (Education; Higher Education; Training & Technical Education; Art, Culture and Language; Sports) and Committee on Govt Undertakings.

Early life

Bharti was born in Baranwal Bania family at Hisua Bazar in Nawada. He was educated firstly at a local school and went to Patna for intermediate education. After completing his post-graduate M.Sc. from IIT Delhi, Bharti pursued a degree in law at Delhi University. He served IIT Delhi Alumni Association as its Secretary for 2007-08 and 2011–12 and as IIT Delhi Senator in 2008.

Business career 

In the 2000s, Somnath Bharti ran a Delhi-based IT firm Madgen Solutions. The Spamhaus Project accused him of spamming on behalf of TopSites LLC, naming him in Register of Known Spam Operations (ROKSO) as one of the top spam operators in the world. According to Bharti, he was listed in ROKSO after an Open Directory Project editor Conrad Longmore ran a story on him. Responding to a PCQuest investigation in 2005, he insisted that all the e-mails sent by his company complied with the laws and regulations. PCQuest found that he had been sued in a California Superior Court for spamming by Daniel Balsam. Balsam's attorney Timothy Walton revealed that in 2004, Bharti and two others had paid Balsam  in damages apart from making a court declaration agreeing to use only confirmed opt-in e-mail addresses when sending commercial e-mails. Bharti defended himself by saying that he chose to settle because defending the case in the United States would have been costlier for him. Bharti also claimed that he was in touch with SpamHaus, but the SpamHaus CEO Steve Linford denied this to PCQuest.

Activism 

In June 2012, Bharti was involved in a campaign against the alleged interference of the then Minister of Human Resources and Development, Kapil Sibal, in the Joint Entrance Examination process for admission to Indian Institutes of Technology.
In 2010–2013, he appeared in news for defending the rights of homeschooled children and subscribers of alternate education system in view of the binding provision of the Right of Children to Free and Compulsory Education Act through Public Interest Litigations filed in Delhi High Court thrice. In response to his PILs, the Ministry of Human Resources and Development, through an affidavit, clarified that they are not against homeschooling.

Law career 

In 2009, Bharti represented Vikram Buddhi. He led a movement against the abeyance of sentencing of Buddhi in the USA.

Patiala House Court had in 2013 indicted Bharti for "tampering with evidence" along with his client, Pawan Kumar, in a corruption case. He was asked by the Bar Council of Delhi to explain why he should not be disbarred.

Political career 

Bharti was the Aam Aadmi Party candidate for the Malviya Nagar constituency in the Delhi state assembly elections, 2013. Bharti won the seat, defeating Arti Mehra of the Bharatiya Janata Party and the incumbent Kiran Walia of the Indian National Congress. Walia had won the seat in 1999, 2003, and 2008 and had been education minister in the earlier government, while Mehra, who has represented the neighbouring Hauz Khas constituency for many years, had been Mayor of Delhi in 2007–2009. In contrast, Bharti was new to politics.

Bharti was briefly Minister of Law, Tourism, Administrative Reforms, Art & Culture in the Government of Delhi. He was appointed on 28 December 2013 and left office on 14 February 2014 when the government of which he was a part resigned due a failure to enact a Jan Lokpal bill. In January 2014, during his time in office, Bharti revealed the identity of a Danish tourist who had been raped, despite such identification being illegal in India.

The government's resignation, led by Arvind Kejriwal, pre-empted a personal resignation by Bharti in response to accusations of vigilantism. Some residents in the Khirkee Extension area of Delhi had complained to Bharti about a drug and prostitution racket allegedly being run by African nationals. In January 2014, he and some AAP workers, together with television camera crews, visited the area. Bharti and his supporters asked the police to raid the homes rented by Africans. When the police refused to do so, citing a lack of a warrant, a group led by Bharti allegedly caught four women and forced them to give urine tests. The tests conducted at AIIMS did not find any drug traces in their system. The women alleged that they had been threatened and molested by the mob.

The AAP supported Bharti, calling the women's allegations false and stating that his actions were not racist and that residents had long complained of criminal activities by Africans in the area. Kejriwal demanded suspension of the police officers who had refused to conduct the raid. A court directed the police to lodge a First Information Report against the mob, and the Delhi Commission for Women also opened an investigation into the matter. Kejriwal's government had come under increasing political pressure to act against Bharti in the hours preceding its resignation. An independent judicial enquiry conducted on behalf of the Lieutenant-Governor of Delhi announced on 28 February 2014 that the police had been correct not to accede to Bharti's demands and that Bharti should not have then taken the law into his own hands by leading the raid.
He was elected again by the people of Malviya Nagar constituency in Feb 2015 by double the margin than the last time when Delhi gave mandate of 67 out of 70 seats in Delhi assembly to AAP. He was sent to Delhi Development Authority as a member of the Board which controls Land and development of Delhi. His work can be gauged from the fact that his efforts and continuous efforts made DDA claim their unclaimed and open to encroachers over 65000 pieces of lands across Delhi.

Domestic abuse allegations

On 10 September 2015, Bharti was arrested on a domestic abuse case after his wife alleged he beat her for a prolonged period. A non-bailable warrant was also issued against him by a Delhi High Court. The Delhi High Court rejected his anticipatory bail plea and he finally surrendered at the Dwarka Police Station late at night on 29 September 2015 under directions from the Supreme Court. Bharti obtained conditional bail. On 07.05.2019 Delhi High Court quashed the FIR and dropped all the proceedings against Bharti in domestic violation case and since then they have been living together.

Electoral performance

References

External links

1974 births
IIT Delhi alumni
Living people
People from Delhi
Delhi MLAs 2013–2015
Delhi MLAs 2015–2020
Delhi MLAs 2020–2025
Aam Aadmi Party MLAs from Delhi